The Portsmouth Friends Meetinghouse, Parsonage, and Cemetery (also known as Portsmouth Friends Meeting House or Portsmouth Evangelical Friends Church) is a historic Friends Meeting House and cemetery of the Religious Society of Friends (Quakers), at 11 Middle Road and 2232 E. Main Road in Portsmouth, Rhode Island.

In 1638, exiled religious dissidents from the Massachusetts Bay Colony founded Portsmouth, the second oldest colonial community in Rhode Island.  The Quaker community developed shortly after the community was founded.

The current meetinghouse was built around 1699–1700. The building was used as a Quaker house of worship and school.  During the American Revolutionary War, British troops occupied the building. In 1784 the Moses Brown School was founded at the church. The meeting house was added to the National Register of Historic Places in 1973. Currently, services are held weekly on Sundays at 10:30 am. and 7:00 p.m..  As of 2020, the meeting house is listed for sale.

See also
 List of the oldest buildings in Rhode Island
 Great Friends Meetinghouse
 National Register of Historic Places listings in Newport County, Rhode Island

References

External links

 Portsmouth Evangelical Friends Official website
 
 
 

Quaker meeting houses in Rhode Island
Cemeteries in Rhode Island
Cemeteries on the National Register of Historic Places in Rhode Island
Churches on the National Register of Historic Places in Rhode Island
Churches in Newport County, Rhode Island
17th-century Quaker meeting houses
18th-century Quaker meeting houses
1700 establishments in Rhode Island
Buildings and structures in Portsmouth, Rhode Island
National Register of Historic Places in Newport County, Rhode Island